Yakutsk is the capital of the Sakha Republic, Russia.

Yakutsk may also refer to:
Yakutsk Urban Okrug, a municipal formation in the Sakha Republic, Russia, which the city of Yakutsk and eleven rural localities in its jurisdiction are incorporated as
Yakutsk Airport, an airport in the Sakha Republic, Russia
Yakutsk Time, a time zone in Russia, ten hours ahead of UTC
Asia/Yakutsk, a time zone identifier in the Tz database

See also
 Yakut (disambiguation)